Turcopalpa is a genus of moth in the family Gelechiidae.

Species
 Turcopalpa africana (Povolný, 1968)
 Turcopalpa glaseri Povolný, 1973

References

Gnorimoschemini